William J. Parkinson (May 10, 1844 – January 7, 1902) was an American politician in the state of Washington. He served in the Washington State Senate from 1889 to 1893. From 1889 to 1891, he was President pro tempore of the Senate. He died of a heart attack in 1902.

References

Republican Party Washington (state) state senators
1844 births
1902 deaths
19th-century American politicians